Yevgeny Kafelnikov was the defending champion but lost in the first round to Karol Kučera.

Roger Federer won in the final 6–1, 6–3 against Nicolas Kiefer.

Seeds
A champion seed is indicated in bold text while text in italics indicates the round in which that seed was eliminated.

Draw

Finals

Top half

Bottom half

External links
 2003 Gerry Weber Open draw

2003 Gerry Weber Open